Abdulaziz Khalid Ahmed Khalifa Rajab (born 17 March 1997), commonly referred to as Abdulaziz Khalid, is a Bahraini international footballer who plays as a forward for Al-Najma.

Career statistics

International

References

External links
 

1997 births
Living people
Bahraini footballers
Bahrain international footballers
Association football forwards